Armando Serrano (born 5 May 1972) is a Colombian swimmer. He competed in the men's 200 metre individual medley event at the 1996 Summer Olympics.

References

1972 births
Living people
Colombian male swimmers
Olympic swimmers of Colombia
Swimmers at the 1996 Summer Olympics
Place of birth missing (living people)
Male medley swimmers
20th-century Colombian people